Williams Ismael Riveros Ibáñez (born 20 November 1992) is a Paraguayan professional footballer who plays as a defender for Universitario de Deportes.

Career
Riveros' career began in Paraguay with Sportivo Trinidense, who he made two appearances for in the 2010 Paraguayan Primera División season; his debut arriving on 1 August during a 1–5 loss to Cerro Porteño. The club were relegated in 2010, Riveros subsequently remained with them for two seasons in the División Intermedia. In January 2013, Riveros left to join Primera B Metropolitana's Flandria in Argentina. He made sixteen appearances for Flandria before netting his first goal, versus Tristán Suárez on 18 April 2014. He scored three goals in first three campaigns, before scoring six times in the following three.

On 25 July 2017, Argentine Primera División side Temperley loaned Riveros. His first match came on 27 August against River Plate. Overall, he featured fifteen times whilst on loan with Temperley. He returned to a recently relegated Flandria in July 2018, prior to immediately leaving on loan once again to Ecuadorian club Delfín. He netted on his Delfín debut, scoring the opening goal of a 2–0 victory over L.D.U. Quito.

Career statistics
.

Honours
Flandria
Primera B Metropolitana: 2016
 Delfin S.C.
Ecuadorian Serie A: 2019
 Barcelona S.C.
Liga PRO Ecuador: 2020

References

External links

1992 births
Living people
Sportspeople from Asunción
Paraguayan footballers
Association football defenders
Paraguayan expatriate footballers
Expatriate footballers in Argentina
Expatriate footballers in Ecuador
Paraguayan expatriate sportspeople in Argentina
Paraguayan expatriate sportspeople in Ecuador
Paraguayan Primera División players
Paraguayan División Intermedia players
Primera B Metropolitana players
Primera C Metropolitana players
Primera Nacional players
Argentine Primera División players
Ecuadorian Serie A players
Sportivo Trinidense footballers
Flandria footballers
Club Atlético Temperley footballers
Delfín S.C. footballers